Metasia ophialis is a species of moth of the family Crambidae.

Distribution
This species can be  found in Central and Southern Europe (Albania, Austria, Bosnia and Herzegovina, Bulgaria, Croatia, Czech Republic, France, Greece, Hungary, Italy, North Macedonia, Romania, Slovakia, Spain, Switzerland and Yugoslavia).

Description
Wings are whitish, with irregular transversal brown lines.

This species is rather similar to Dolicharthria bruguieralis.

Biology
Adults are on wing from June to September depending on the location.

References 

Treitschke, F. (1829): Die Schmetterlinge von Europa 7: I-VI, 1-252. Leipzig

External links
 Lepiforum 
 Paolo Mazzei, Daniel Morel, Raniero Panfili Moths and Butterflies of Europe and North Africa
 Insecta.pro
 Hlasek

Metasia
Moths of Europe
Moths described in 1829
Insects of Turkey